PS1, Ps 1, PS-1, PS/1 or PS One may refer to:

Arts and entertainment
 Ponniyin Selvan: I, an Indian Tamil language period action drama film

Technology
 "$PS1", "Prompt String 1" the environment variable in a command-line interface which specifies the command prompt
 IBM PS/1, IBM Personal System/1 series of home computers
 Pan-STARRS' first telescope, called PS1
 PostScript Type 1 Font
 Prosteyshiy Sputnik 1, the first artificial Earth satellite
 .ps1, the extension of a Microsoft PowerShell script file

Video gaming
 PlayStation (console), video game console released by Sony in 1994
 PS One (console), a miniature version of the original PlayStation released in 2000
 Phantasy Star (video game), the first in the Phantasy Star series
 PlanetSide (video game), the first in the PlanetSide MMOFPS video game series

Other uses
 Photosystem I, the second photosystem in the photosynthetic light reactions of plants
 MoMA PS1 (derived from "Public School One"), American contemporary art institution
 The name and designation for several public schools in the New York City Department of Education; see List of public elementary schools in New York City
 Psalm 1 from the Judeo-Christian Book of Psalms
 The boxcar in the PS line of post-war standardized freight cars from Pullman-Standard